Death's Requiem is an Australian 2007 short film. It tells of Nathan Chapel, a terminally ill comic book artist with an obsession for death. But When the Grim Reaper himself pays Nathan comes to life to haunt him, Nathan's greatest fears are realized.

The film starred Jai Koutrae as Nathan Chapel. This role garnered him much fame and won him numerous awards including the Screen Actors Guild Awards, Method Fest Independent Film Festival Award and the Luciania Film Festival Award for Best Actor in a Short Film. Awards also went to the Sound Designer/Mixer Stephen Hope and Sound Recordist David Glasser an Australian Screen Sound Guild Award for Best Achievement in Sound for a Short Film.

Synopsis
Nathan Chapel is a terminally ill comic book artist who possesses a lifelong obsession with death and a voyeuristic preoccupation with his self-destructive neighbor Sarah. When Death himself, comes to life to haunt him, Nathan must confront his greatest fears, leading him to an act of self-sacrifice.

References

External links 
 

2007 films
2007 short films
Australian short films
2000s English-language films
2000s Australian films